The Sup'ung Line is an electrified railway line of the Korean State Railway in North P'yŏngan Province, North Korea, running from Pup'ung on the P'yŏngbuk Line to Sup'ung.

History
The Sup'ung Line was opened, together with the main line, by the P'yŏngbuk Railway on 27 September 1939 to assist with the construction of the Sup'ung Dam.

Following the partition of Korea the line was located within the Soviet zone of occupation, and was nationalised along with all the other railways in the zone by the Provisional People’s Committee for North Korea on 10 August 1946, becoming part of the Korean State Railway. Electrification of the entire line was completed in 1980.

Services
Sup'ung Station, the terminus of the line, is served by six pairs of commuter trains that run along the Ch'ongsu—Sup'ung—P'ungnyŏn route.

Route 

A yellow background in the "Distance" box indicates that section of the line is not electrified.

References

Railway lines in North Korea
Standard gauge railways in North Korea